are Australian citizens and residents who claim Japanese ancestry.

Japanese people first arrived in the 1870s (despite a ban on emigration in place until 1886). During the late 19th and early 20th centuries Japanese migrants played a prominent role in the pearl industry of north-western Australia. By 1911, the Japanese population while small groups had grown to approximately 3,500 people.  With the outbreak of war in the Pacific in 1941, most Japanese in Australia were interned and then deported when the war ended. At the end of the war only 74 Japanese citizens and their children were permitted to remain in Australia.  Not until the 1970s did the Japanese population recover to the levels at the start of the 20th century.  As of 2011, of Australia's 35,378 Japan-born residents, more than 65% had arrived from the mid-1990s onwards.

According to a global survey conducted at the end of 2013, Australia was the most popular country for Japanese people to live in.

History
The first person from Japan to settle in Australia was recorded in 1871.

Japanese only began to emigrate en masse in the 1880s following the lifting of restrictions.  In Australia, the Immigration Restriction Act 1901 temporarily prevented more Japanese from migrating, but subsequent exemptions to the dictation test were applied to Japanese people mitigating restrictions.

In Australia from the late 19th and early 20th Century many worked as pearlers in Northern Australia or in the sugar cane industry in Queensland.  They were particularly prominent in the Western Australian Kimberley town of Broome, where until the Second World War they were the largest ethnic group.  Several streets of Broome have Japanese names, the town has one of the largest Japanese cemeteries outside Japan and the creole language Broome Pearling Lugger Pidgin contained many Japanese words.

Between December 1941 and September 1945, Australia and Japan were at war.  On July 28, 1941, Australian military intelligence indicated that there were 1139 Japanese living in Australia and 36 in Australian-controlled territories. Under the guise of national security, 1141 Japanese civilians (almost the entire population) living in Australia were interned for up to six years throughout WWII. An additional 3160 Japanese civilians arrested in allied countries across the Asia-Pacific Region were also interned in Australia on a user-pay basis; this included 600 Formosans (Taiwanese). An unknown number of Koreans were arrested as Japanese and carried Japanese names. The internment of Japanese in Australia was more racial than political, with Japanese being "evacuated" from their hometowns "for their own good" (ie, to prevent racist attacks against them by non-Japanese). Several months after the cessation of hostilities, all ethnic-Japanese internees who did not possess Australian nationality were repatriated to Occupied Japan, regardless of the locations of their previous abodes, whilst all ethnic-Formosans were repatriated to Occupied Formosa.

The Japanese population in Australia was later replenished in the 1950s by the arrival of 500 Japanese war brides, who had married AIF soldiers stationed in occupied Japan.

Ethnic Japanese settlers from Peru settled Australia following the dictatorship of Revolutionary Government of the Armed Forces of Peru in 1968.

The lifting of barriers in Australia to non-European immigration in 1973 coincided with the Japanese post-war economic miracle which dissuaded Japanese from emigrating. Japan's increasing economic importance to Australia from the 1960s, and rising prosperity and linkages between the two countries, led to an increase in the number of Japanese choosing to live in Australia.

Demography

The 2011 census recorded 35,378 Japanese-born residents in Australia, with 50,761 people reporting Japanese ancestry (including those who claimed other ancestries).  Of this number 29,211 reporting speaking Japanese at home. New South Wales had the largest population of Japanese born (12,108), followed by Queensland (10,317), Victoria (6,820) and Western Australia (3,564).

Only 4,643 Japanese-born residents have since acquired Australian citizenship.  In 2011, women represented 68% (24,146) of the Japanese-born in Australia.

Over half of all Japanese-born residents profess no religious affiliation (52.6%), with Buddhism (26.3%) and Catholicism (4.1%) the most commonly identified religions.

Education

Japanese international day schools in Australia include the Sydney Japanese International School (SJIS), the Japanese School of Melbourne (JSM), and the Japanese School in Perth (JSP).  There are also weekend supplementary programmes in Brisbane, Cairns, Canberra, Melbourne, Perth approved by the Japanese Ministry of Education. 
 The Japanese Language Supplementary School of Queensland
 Adelaide Japanese Community School (ACJS; アデレード日本語補習授業校 Aderēdo Nihongo Hoshū Jugyō Kō)
 Cairns Japanese Language Tutorial Centre Inc. (ケアンズ日本語補習授業校 Keanzu Nihongo Hoshū Jugyō Kō'')
 Canberra Japanese Supplementary School
 Melbourne International School of Japanese
 The Weekend Japanese School in Perth

Notable figures
Akira Isogawa: Fashion designer
Tando Velaphi: Football (soccer) player
Tetsuya Wakuda: Chef
Emma Anzai: Bassist for the band Sick Puppies
Erika Yamasaki: Weightlifter
Eddie Jones: Former Australian rugby union coach
Gehamat Shibasaki: Rugby league player
Yumi Stynes: Television personality
Jimmy Chi: Composer, musician and playwright
Sean Wroe: Runner
Yasukichi Murakami: Inventor
Last Dinosaurs: Band members Sean Caskey, Lachlan Caskey, and Dan Koyama
Yūko Miyamura: Voice actress, best known for voicing Asuka Langley Soryu in Neon Genesis Evangelion
Sarah Emi Bridcutt: Voice actress
Jason Davidson: Australian football (soccer) player
Alan Davidson: Former Australian football (soccer) player
Masa Yamaguchi: Actor, stunt performer
George Miller: Internet celebrity and musician
Sarah Àlainn: Vocalist, violinist
Kumi Taguchi: Journalist and newsreader for the ABC
Shiori Kutsuna: Actress, model
Shu Uchida: Voice Actress
Sen Mitsuji: Actor
Tai Hara: Actor, model and presenter
Takaya Honda: Actor and television presenter
Rob Lucas: Treasurer of South Australia (1997-2002, 2018-2022)
Joey Bizinger: YouTuber based in Japan
Alex Davies: Australian rules footballer
Michito Owens: Australian rules footballer
Rinky Hijikata: Professional tennis player

Gallery

See also

Asian Australians
Australia–Japan relations
Japanese community of Melbourne
Nichigo Press, Australia's longest established Japanese language newspaper

References

Further reading

External links
Australian Bureau of Statistics
Immigration Museum

Asian Australian
 
 
Australia–Japan relations